Ian Hamilton's March is a book written by Winston Churchill. It is a description of his experiences accompanying the British army during the Second Boer War, continuing after the events described in London to Ladysmith via Pretoria.

Writing
Churchill had officially resigned from the British army in order to pursue a political career, but on hearing of the outbreak of war in South Africa between the British colonies and the free Boer states of Transvaal and Orange Free State, immediately made arrangements to take part. He arranged to act as correspondent for The Morning Post, and by playing them off against the rival newspaper, the Daily Mail, obtained a salary of £250 per month. He also persuaded the Colonial Secretary Joseph Chamberlain to write him a letter of introduction to the High Commissioner for Southern Africa, Alfred Milner. He sailed from Southampton aboard the Dunottar Castle on 14 October and reached Cape Town on the 31st.

The book is an edited collection of reports originally published in a newspaper. Returning from the war, Churchill arranged to publish them as a collection and the book appeared in May 1900 published by Longmans and eventually sold 8,000 copies. In 1930 Churchill produced an autobiography, My Early Life, which also had several chapters devoted to his Boer War experiences.

The events described
The book describes General Ian Standish Monteith Hamilton's campaign from Bloemfontein to Pretoria.  Hamilton travelled four hundred miles from Bloemfontein to Pretoria fighting ten major battles with Boer forces and fourteen minor ones.

Editions

References

Further reading

External links
 
 

1900 non-fiction books
Books by Winston Churchill
English non-fiction literature
Second Boer War books
Books written by prime ministers of the United Kingdom